Chomo may refer to:

Prison slang for "child molester"
The name of several mountains in the Himalayas, including Chomo Lhari, Chomo Yummo, and Chomo Lonzo
the Chumbi Valley, called Chomo in Tibet
Chomo County, also called Yadong County, which spans the Chumbi Valley